The Habeas Corpus Suspension Act 1798 (38 Geo. III, c. 36) was an Act of Parliament passed by the Parliament of Great Britain.

On 28 February 1798 five members of the leading Jacobin Societies were arrested at Margate while they were trying to travel to France. After interrogating them for evidence, arrests of other Jacobins occurred in Leicester, Manchester and London (where forty-seven members of the London Corresponding Society were arrested between 18 and 20 April). Some of those arrested were released within a few days while others were held for nearly three years. To facilitate these arrests, the suspension of habeas corpus was passed, although only one of the Margate five was convicted. The Act expired on 1 February 1799, although Foxite MPs had wished for 1 November as the expiry date.

See also
Habeas Corpus Suspension Act

Notes

Habeas corpus
Great Britain Acts of Parliament 1798